Following is the organization of the Soviet Air Forces (Voenno-Vozdushnye Sily) on May 1, 1945. The primary source for this list is the Boevoi sostav Sovetskoi armii (Combat Composition of the Soviet Army) list for 1 May 1945.

Leningrad Front

15th Air Army 

5th Bomber Corps (4th, 5th Guards Bomber Aviation Divisions)

14th Fighter Corps 

185th, 315th Fighter Aviation Divisions

Other units 
284th, 313th Night Bomber Aviation Divisions
214th, 225th, 305th Assault Aviation Divisions
99th Guards Reconnaissance Aviation Regiment
187th Fire Correction Aviation Regiment
699th Transport Aviation Regiment
97th Aviation Regiment of the Civil Air Fleet
87th Night Bomber Aviation Squadron
336th Fighter Aviation Division
1639th, 1683rd, 1685th Anti-Aircraft Artillery Regiment

1003rd Separate Medical Evacuation Aviation Regiment

13th Air Army 
281st Assault Aviation Division
275th Fighter Aviation Division
13th Reconnaissance Aviation Regiment
199th Communications Aviation  Regiment
1583rd, 1674th Anti-Aircraft Artillery Regiments

3rd Belorussian Front

1st Air Army

6th Guards, 276th Bomber Aviation Divisions
1st Guards, 182nd, 277th, 311th Assault Aviation Divisions
129th, 130th, 303rd, 330th Fighter Aviation Divisions
213th Night Bomber Aviation Division
406th Night Bomber Aviation Regiment
10th, 90th Reconnaissance Aviation Regiments
117th, 151st Fire Correction Aviation Regiments
142nd Transport Aviation Regiment
1st Separate Evacuation Aviation Regiment
354th Communications Aviation Regiment
1st French Air Regiment
1551st, 1552nd, 1553rd, 1665th, 1602nd, 1608th Anti-Aircraft Artillery Regiments

3rd Air Army

11th Fighter Aviation Corps 
5th Guards, 190th Fighter Aviation Divisions

Other units 
3rd Guards Bomber Aviation Division
314th Nighter Bomber Divisions
211th, 335th Assault Aviation Divisions
259th Fighter Aviation Division
6th Guards Assault Aviation Regiment
11th Reconnaissance Aviation Regiment
206th Fire Correction Aviation Regiment
763rd Transport Aviation Regiment
87th Separate Evacuation Aviation Regiment
399th Communications Aviation Regiment
1556th, 1557th, 1558th, 1604th Anti-Aircraft Artillery Regiments

2nd Belorussian Front
994th Communications Aviation Regiment operating in conjunction with the 5th Guards Tank Army

4th Air Army

5th Bomber Corps

132nd, 327th Bomber Aviation Divisions

4th Ground Attack Corps

196th, 199th Bomber Aviation Divisions

8th Fighter Corps

215th, 323rd Fighter Aviation Divisions

Other units

230th, 233rd, 260th, 332nd Assault Aviation Divisions
229th, 269th, 309th, 329th Fighter Aviation Divisions 
325th Night Bomber Aviation Division
47th, 164th Guards Reconnaissance Aviation Regiments
204th, 209th Fire Correction  Aviation Regiments
213th Separate Evacuation Aviation  Regiment
184th Communications Aviation  Regiment
844th Transport Aviation Regiment
69th Civil Air Fleet Regiment
1550th, 1559th, 1584th, 1601st, 1606th, 1607th, 1655th Anti-Aircraft Artillery Regiments

1st Belorussian Front
191st Guards Communications Aviation  Regiment operating in conjunction with the 1st Guards Tank Army;

16th Air Army

3rd Bomber Corps

183rd, 241st, 301st Bomber Aviation Divisions

6th Bomber Corps

113th, 326th, 334th Bomber Aviation Divisions

6th Assault Aviation Corps

197th, 198th Assault Aviation Divisions

9th Assault Aviation Corps

3rd Guards, 300th Assault Aviation Divisions

1st Guards Fighter Aviation Corps

3rd and 4th Guards Fighter Aviation Divisions

3rd Fighter Aviation Corps

265th, 278th Fighter Aviation Divisions

6th Fighter Aviation Corps

234th, 273rd Fighter Aviation Divisions

13th Fighter Aviation Corps

193rd, 283rd Fighter Aviation Divisions

Other units

188th, 221st Bomber Aviation Divisions
2nd, 11th Guards Assault Aviation Divisions
1st Guards Fighter Aviation Division
240th Fighter Aviation Division
282nd Fighter Aviation Division
286th Fighter Aviation Division
9th Guards, 242nd Night Bomber Aviation Divisions
176th Guards Fighter Aviation Regiment
16th, 72nd Reconnaissance  Aviation Regiments
93rd, 98th Fire Correction Aviation Regiments
226th Transport Aviation Regiment
62nd Guards Civil Air Fleet  Regiment
325th, 1560th, 1581st, 1597th, 1609th, 1610th, 1611th, 1612th, 1974th Anti-Aircraft Artillery Regiments

Subordinated units and groups

6th Separate Evacuation Aviation Regiment
919th Communications Aviation  Regiment

1st Ukrainian Front
372nd Communications Aviation  Regiment operating in conjunction with the 3rd Guards Tank Army;
1002nd Mixed Aviation Regiment (subordinate to front authority);

2nd Air Army

4th Bomber Corps
202nd, 219th Bomber Aviation Divisions

6th Guards Bomber Corps
1st, 8th Guards Bomber Aviation Divisions

1st Guards Assault Aviation Corps
8th, 9th Guards  Assault Aviation Divisions

2nd Guards Assault Aviation Corps
5th, 6th Guards Assault Aviation Divisions

3rd Assault Aviation Corps
307th, 308th Assault Aviation Divisions, 181st Fighter Aviation Division

2nd Fighter Aviation Corps
7th Guards, 322nd Fighter Aviation Divisions

5th Fighter Aviation Corps
8th Guards, 256th Fighter Aviation Divisions

6th Guards Fighter Aviation Corps
9th, 22nd, 23rd Guards Fighter Aviation Divisions
11th, 12th Guards Fighter Aviation Divisions

Other units 
208th Night Bomber Aviation Division
98th Guards Separate Reconnaissance Aviation Regiment
193rd Guards Reconnaissance Aviation Regiment
118th, 203rd Fire Correction Aviation Regiments, 228th Transport  Aviation Regiment
4th Separate  Evacuation Aviation  Regiment
23rd Regiment of the Civil Air Fleet
1554th, 1555th, 1561st, 1577th, 1582nd, 1605th, 1613th, 1680th Anti-Aircraft Artillery Regiment

4th Ukrainian Front

8th Air Army

8th Assault Aviation Corps 
224th, 227th Assault Aviation Division

10th Fighter Aviation Corps
10th, 15th Guards Fighter Aviation Division
321st Bomber Aviation Division
8th Reconnaissance Aviation Regiment
100th Fire Correction Reconnaissance Aviation Regiment
678th Transportation Aviation Regiment
212th Independent Evacuation Aviation Regiment
200th Aviation Signals Regiment
87th Guards Aviation Regiment of Civil Air Fleet
1578th, 1603th, 1682nd Air Defense Artillery Regiment

2nd Ukrainian Front
6th Guards Tank Army - 207th Guards Communications Aviation Regiment

5th Air Army
3rd Guards Assault Aviation Corps  
7th and 12th Guards Assault Aviation Divisions
5th Assault Aviation Corps 
4th Guards and 264th Assault Aviation Divisions
3rd Guards Fighter Aviation Corps
13th and 14th Guards Fighter Aviation Divisions
218th Bomber Aviation Division
312th Night Bomber Aviation Division
6th Guards, 279th and 331st  Fighter Aviation Divisions
511th Reconnaissance Aviation Regiment
207th Fire Correction Aviation Regiment
95th Transport Aviation Regiment
44th Aviation Regiment of Civil Air Fleet

Subordinated units and groups 
 85th, 1001st Separate Medical Evacuation Aviation Regiment
 714th Communications Aviation Regiment

3rd Ukrainian Front

17th Air Army
10th Assault Aviation Corps 
136th Assault Aviation Division
306th Assault Aviation Division
244th Bomber Aviation Division
189th Assault Aviation Division
194th, 288th, 295th Fighter Aviation Division
262nd Night Bomber Aviation Division
39th Reconnaissance Aviation Regiment
96th Fire Correction Aviation Regiment
227th Transport Aviation Regiment
3rd Separate Medical Evacuation Aviation Regiment
282nd Communications Aviation Regiment
1614th, 1615th, 1654th, 1676th, 1975th Anti-Aircraft Artillery Regiment
Air Group of General-Major Vitruk (did not have contact with the enemy)
10th Guards Assault Aviation Division
236th Fighter Aviation Division

Long Range Aviation (18th Air Army from December 1944)
1st Guards Bomber Aviation Corps 
11th and 16th Guards, 36th, 48th Bomber Aviation Divisions 
2nd Guards Bomber Aviation Corps
2nd, 7th, 13th and 18th Guards Bomber Aviation Division 
3rd Guards Bomber Aviation Corps
22nd Guards, 1st, 12th and 50th Bomber Aviation Divisions 
4th Guards Bomber Aviation Corps
14th and 15th Guards, 53rd, and 54th Bomber Aviation Divisions

Subordinated units and groups 
 45th Bomber Aviation Division
 56th Long-Range Fighter Aviation Division

Air Defence Forces for State Territory

A note regarding the use of "patrol Area of". The actual term used in the Russian order of battle is ob'yekty, which literally means 'objects'. However, in the military sense it can mean structures, and targets. One possible interpretation that can be offered to better define the use in English is that the meaning here is of the actual "area of responsibility" of the unit in terms of military installations, facilities, military logistics networks and other possible enemy targets. In this sense the meaning is more area-related then referring to a specific location, specifying the area that the air unit would have to cover.

Western Front PVO
2nd Corps PVO (Air Defence) Patrol Area of Leningrad Front 
106th Fighter Aviation Division 
145th and 147th Guards, 33rd, 115th, 445th Fighter Aviation Regiments
124th Fighter Aviation Division 
126th, 416th, 964th, 966th Fighter Aviation Regiments
441st Fighter Aviation Regiment (from the 125th Fighter Aviation Division)
5th Corps PVO  Patrol Area of 1st Belorussian Front - 826th Fighter Aviation Regiment (36th Fighter Aviation Division), 148th Fighter Aviation Division (148th Guards, 785th, 907th, 1006th Fighter Aviation Regiments), 320th Fighter Aviation Division (652nd, 862nd, 963rd Fighter Aviation Regiments)
13th Corps PVO Patrol Area of Belorussian-Lithuanian military district - 125th Fighter Aviation Division (730th, 787th Fighter Aviation Regiments)
14th Corps PVO Patrol Area of Belorussian-Lithuanian military district - 328th Fighter Aviation Division (722nd, 959th, 960th Fighter Aviation Regiments)
79th Division PVO Patrol Area of Belorussian-Lithuanian military district - 144th Fighter Aviation Division, HQ Baranovichi (144th, 383rd, 439th Fighter Aviation Regiments), 495th Fighter Aviation Regiment (36th Fighter Aviation Division)
82nd Division PVO (Air Defense) Patrol Area of 1st Belorussian Front - 36th Fighter Aviation Division (405th, 591st, 651st, 827th Fighter Aviation Regiments)
South-Western Front PVO (Air Defense)
7th Corps PVO (Air Defense) Patrol Area of Kiev and Kharkov Military Districts  - 9th Fighter Aviation Corps (39th and 146th Guards, 573rd, 894th, 1007th Fighter Aviation Regiments)
8th Corps PVO (Air Defense) Patrol Area of L'vov military district - 10th Fighter Aviation Corps (182nd, 266th, 628th, 631st, 961st Fighter Aviation Regiments)
9th Corps PVO (Air Defense) Patrol Area of 2nd Ukrainian Front - 141st Fighter Aviation Division (234th, 586th, 933rd Fighter Aviation Regiments)
12th Corps PVO (Air Defense) Patrol Area of 2nd Ukrainian Front  - 2nd Guards Fighter Aviation Division (38th, 83rd and 84th Guards Fighter Aviation Regiments), 743rd Fighter Aviation Regiment (123rd Fighter Aviation Division)
85th Division PVO (Air Defense) Patrol Area of Kharkov and Odessa military districts, Separate Coastal Army - 126th Fighter Aviation Division (802nd, 822nd, 833rd Fighter Aviation Regiments)
86th Division PVO (Air Defense) Patrol Area of Odessa Military District  - 123rd Fighter Aviation Division (417th, 965th Fighter Aviation Regiments)
88th Division PVO (Air Defense) Patrol Area of 1st Ukrainian Front  - 310th Fighter Aviation Division (268th, 348th, 908th Fighter Aviation Regiments)
Front Formations and units in Patrol Area of Moscow Military District - 127th Fighter Aviation Division (738th, 934th, 1003rd Fighter Aviation Regiments)
Central Front PVO (Air Defense)
Leningrad Air Defence Army (Air Defense) Patrol Area of Leningrad Front - 2nd Guards Fighter Aviation Corps (11th, 25th, 27th, 102nd and 105th Guards, 403rd Fighter Aviation Regiments)
Moscow PVO Forces
1st PVO Fighter Air Army (Air Defense) Patrol Area of Central Front PVO (Air Defense) 
104th Fighter Aviation Division (119th, 729th Fighter Aviation Regiments)
122nd Fighter Aviation Division (767th, 768th, 769th Fighter Aviation Regiments) 
142nd Fighter Aviation Division (143rd, 423rd, 632nd, 786th, 1005th Fighter Aviation Regiments) 
317th Fighter Aviation Division (12th Guards, 488th, 736rd Fighter Aviation Regiments) 
318th Fighter Aviation Division (11th, 28th, 562nd, 565th, 740th Fighter Aviation Regiments) 
319th Fighter Aviation Division (16th, 67th, 177th, 178th, 309th Fighter Aviation Regiments)
Patrol Area of Coastal PVO Army of Far-East Front - 147th Fighter Aviation Division (34th, 400th, 401st, 404th, 429th, 564th Fighter Aviation Regiments)
Patrol Area of Amur Air Defence Army (Air Defense) of Far-Eastern Front - 149th Fighter Aviation Division (3rd, 18th, 60th Fighter Aviation Regiments)
Patrol Area of Transbaikal PVO zone  (Air Defense) of Transbaikal Front - 297th Fighter Aviation Division (938th, 939th Fighter Aviation Regiments)
Independent PVO formations and units of the country
99th Division PVO (Air Defense) Patrol Area of Transcaucasian Front - 298th Fighter Aviation Division (35th, 982nd, 983rd Fighter Aviation Regiments)
Baku Air Defence Army (Air Defense) Patrol Area of Transcaucasian Front - 8th Fighter Aviation Corps (82nd, 480th, 481st, 922nd, 962nd Fighter Aviation Regiments)

STAVKA Reserve of Military High Command

7th Air Army
280th Assault Aviation Division
257th Fighter Aviation Division
324th Fighter Aviation Division
80th Short-Range Bomber Aviation Regiment
114th Guards Long-Range Aviation Regiment
679th Night Bomber Aviation Regiment
716th Night Bomber Aviation Regiment
118th Reconnaissance Aviation Squadron
119th Reconnaissance Aviation Squadron
1599th Anti-Aircraft Artillery Regiment

14th Air Army
107th Separate Signals Aviation Regiment
30th Civil Air Fleet Aviation Regiment

18th Air Army
73rd Auxiliary Long-Range Aviation Regiment
742nd Long-Range Reconnaissance Aviation Regiment

Reserve Front
81st Medical Evacuation Aviation Regiment
121st Separate Signal Aviation Regiment

Independent Formations and units of Reserve of STAVKA Military High Command
114th Fighter Aviation Regiment
9th Guards Bomber Aviation Corps
19th Guards Bomber Aviation Division
20th Guards Bomber Aviation Division
21st Guards Bomber Aviation Division
7th Assault Aviation Corps
206th Assault Aviation Division
289th Assault Aviation Division

Military districts
Moscow Military District
2nd Special Destination Aviation Division
4th Special Destination Aviation Division
10th Guards Bomber Aviation Regiment
860th Bomber Aviation Regiment
252nd Separate Signal Aviation Regiment
396th Separate Signal Aviation Regiment
918th Separate Signal Aviation Regiment
852nd Ferry Aviation Regiment
853rd Ferry Aviation Regiment
856th Ferry Aviation Regiment
75th Corrective Aviation Squadron
White Sea Military District
261st Assault Aviation Division
16th Guards Fighter Aviation Division
108th Reconnaissance Aviation Squadron
Belorussian-Lithuanian military district
272nd Fighter Aviation Regiment
2nd Medical Aviation Regiment
Orel Military District
1000th Assault Aviation Regiment
857th Transport Aviation Regiment
Kiev Military District
15th Guards Assault Aviation Division
245th Assault Aviation Regiment
51st Fighter Aviation Regiment
3rd Transport Aviation Regiment
Lvov Military District
5th Medical Aviation Regiment
Odessa Military District
48th Guards Reconnaissance Aviation Regiment
222nd Ferry Aviation Regiment
Kharkov Military District
620th Assault Aviation Regiment
254th Fighter Aviation Regiment
896th Fighter Aviation Regiment
926th Fighter Aviation Regiment
Volga Military District
220th Mixed Aviation Regiment
217th Assault Aviation Regiment
221st Ferry Aviation Regiment
850th Ferry Aviation Regiment
851st Ferry Aviation Regiment

Inactive Fronts

Transcaucasus Front

Subordinated units and groups
492nd Assault Aviation Regiment
25th Fighter Aviation Regiment
167th Fighter Aviation Regiment
149th Reconnaissance Aviation Squadron
335th Long-range Reconnaissance Aviation Squadron

Central Asian Military District
333rd Assault Aviation Division
238th Fighter Aviation Division
15th Reconnaissance Aviation Squadron

Siberian Military District
9th Ferry Aviation Regiment

Transbaikal Front

12th Air Army
30th Bomber Aviation Division
247th Bomber Aviation Division
248th Assault Aviation Division
316th Assault Aviation Division
245th Fighter Aviation Division
246th Fighter Aviation Division
12th Reconnaissance Aviation Regiment
23rd Heavy Bomber Aviation Squadron
40th Corrective Aviation Squadron
41st Corrective Aviation Squadron
144th Independent Anti-Aircraft Artillery Battery
145th Independent Anti-Aircraft Artillery Battery
146th Independent Anti-Aircraft Artillery Battery
147th Independent Anti-Aircraft Artillery Battery
148th Independent Anti-Aircraft Artillery Battery
149th Independent Anti-Aircraft Artillery Battery
150th Independent Anti-Aircraft Artillery Battery

Far Eastern Front

10th Air Army
83rd Bomber Aviation Division
253rd Assault Aviation Division
29th Fighter Aviation Division
254th Fighter Aviation Division
528th Fighter Aviation Division
7th Reconnaissance Aviation Regiment
411th Corrective Reconnaissance Aviation Regiment
344th Transport Aviation Regiment

Subordinated units and groups
18th Aviation Corps
96th Assault Aviation Division
296th Fighter Aviation Division
777th Fighter Aviation Division
140th Reconnaissnce Aviation Squadron
28th Fire Correction Aviation Squadron
19th Bomber Aviation Corps
33rd Bomber Aviation Division
55th Bomber Aviation Division
442nd Long-range Bomber Aviation Regiment
443rd Long-range Bomber Aviation Regiment
128th Mixed Aviation Division
255th Mixed Aviation Division
799th Reconnaissance Aviation Regiment
19th Fighter Aviation Squadron

Coastal Group of Forces

9th Air Army
34th Bomber Aviation Division
251st Assault Aviation Division
252nd Assault Aviation Division
32nd Fighter Aviation Division
249th Fighter Aviation Division
250th Fighter Aviation Division
6th Reconnaissance Aviation Regiment
464th Corrective Reconnaissance Aviation Regiment
281st Transport Aviation Regiment

References

Source 
Combat Composition of the Soviet Army 1 May 1945

Units and formations of the Soviet Air Forces
World War II orders of battle
1945 in military history